The 2022–23 UCLA Bruins men's basketball team represents the University of California, Los Angeles during the 2022–23 NCAA Division I season. The Bruins are led by fourth-year head coach Mick Cronin, and they play their home games at Pauley Pavilion as members of the Pac-12 Conference. Guard/forward Jaime Jaquez Jr. was named a second-team All-American. He was voted the Pac-12 Player of the Year, and received first-team All-Pac-12 honors along with guard Tyger Campbell. Guard Jaylen Clark was named to the second team and was voted the Pac-12 Defensive Player of the Year. He was placed on the conference's all-defensive team along with forward Adem Bona, who was named the  Pac-12 Freshman of the Year. Cronin was voted the Pac-12 Coach of the Year. 

UCLA lost five players who were major contributors from their previous year's squad that went 27–8. With a 60–56 win over Colorado on February 26, 2023, the Bruins clinched their first Pac-12 regular season championship since 2012–13. UCLA ended the regular season with an 82–73 win over No. 8 Arizona, extending their home winning streak to 25 games, the longest active streak in the nation. They won the conference by four games and finished the season undefeated at home for the first time since 2006–07. Clark left the game with a lower leg injury, and was ruled out for the Pac-12 tournament. The top-seeded Bruins advanced to the tournament finals before losing 61–59 to No. 2-seed Arizona, ending their 12-game winning streak. UCLA played without its top two defenders, as Bona also missed the game with an injured left shoulder, which he suffered in the semifinals against Oregon. The Bruins, who were vying for a No. 1 seed in the NCAA tournament, received a No. 2 seed in the West Region. It was their highest seeding since they were placed No. 1 in 2008. However, Clark was ruled out for the season. Bona was cleared to return in their opener, but he did not play in the 86–53 rout over No. 15-seed UNC Asheville. He played in the second round against Northwestern, which UCLA won to advance to the Sweet Sixteen for the third straight season.

Previous season

The Bruins finished the 2021–22 season with a 27–8 overall record and a conference record of 15–5. During the season, UCLA was invited and participated in the Empire Classic at the T-Mobile Arena in Paradise, Nevada. UCLA defeated Bellarmine, but they lost to Gonzaga to finish in a tie for second. In the postseason, UCLA defeated Washington State, and USC but lost to Arizona in the championship game of the 2022 Pac-12 Conference men's basketball tournament. The Bruins were invited and participated in the 2022 NCAA Division I men's basketball tournament, where they defeated Akron and Saint Mary's in Portland, OR but lost to North Carolina in Philadelphia, PA in the Sweet Sixteen.

Offseason

Departures

Source:

2022 recruiting class

Preseason

Preseason rankings
 October 17 – No. 8 AP Top 25 poll
 October 26 – Pac-12 Men's Basketball Media Day in San Francisco

Preseason All-Americans/All-conference
 Jaime Jaquez Jr., first-team preseason All-American, Field of 68’s Almanac
 Jaime Jaquez Jr., first-team All-America selection, CBS Sports
 Tyger Campbell, Jaime Jaquez Jr. first team Media Preseason All-conference; Amari Bailey, Jaylen Clark, honorable mention

Preseason award watchlists
 Tyger Campbell, Bob Cousy Point Guard of the Year Award watch list
 Amari Bailey, Jerry West Shooting Guard of the Year Award watch list
 Jaime Jaquez Jr., Julius Erving Small Forward of the Year Award watch list
 Adem Bona, the Kareem Abdul-Jabbar Award (center) watch list
 Jaime Jaquez Jr., NABC Player of the Year Award watch list

Roster

Schedule and results

|-
!colspan=12 style=| Exhibition

|-
!colspan=12 style=|Regular season
{{CBB schedule entry
| date           = November 7, 2022
| nonconf        = yes
| time           = 8:30 p.m.
| rank           = 8
| tv             = P12N
| opponent       = Sacramento State
| gamename       = 
| score          = 76–50
| record         = 1–0
| highscorer     = Clark
| points         = 17
| highrebounder  = Clark 
| rebounds       = 8
| highassister   = | assists        = 4
| site_stadium   = Pauley Pavilion
| attend         = 6,096
| site_cityst    = Los Angeles, CA
}}

|-
!colspan=12 style=| 

|-
!colspan=12 style=| 

Source:

StatisticsUpdated through Mar 6, 2023''

Rankings

*AP does not release post-NCAA Tournament rankings

Awards and honors

 November 15, 2022 – Tyger Campbell and Jaime Jaquez Jr. named to the John R. Wooden Award watch list
 February 17, 2023 – Head coach Mick Cronin named to the 2023 Werner Ladder Naismith Men’s College Coach of the Year candidates list
 March 8, 2023 – Jaime Jaquez Jr. named a finalist for the Julius Erving Small Forward of the Year Award
 March 10, 2023 – Jaime Jaquez Jr. named a semifinalist for the Naismith College Player of the Year; Head coach Mick Cronin named a semifinalist for the Naismith College Coach of the Year
 March 14, 2023 –  Jaylen Clark named a finalists for the Naismith Defensive Player of the Year Award

Notes

References

UCLA Bruins men's basketball seasons
UCLA
UCLA Bruins basketball, men
UCLA Bruins basketball, men
UCLA Bruins basketball, men
UCLA Bruins basketball, men
UCLA